XHTSI-FM is a community radio station in Nuevo San Juan Parangaricutiro, Michoacán, broadcasting on 94.7 FM. It is owned by Kurhándi, A.C., and is known as Radio Tsipikua.

References

Radio stations in Michoacán
Community radio stations in Mexico
Radio stations established in 2015